The Albolaily Mosque is a mosque in Sana'a, Yemen. It lies to the southwest of the Al Shohada Mosque, near Sana'a Fish Market.

See also
 Islam in Yemen
 List of mosques in Yemen

References

Mosques in Sanaa